Ryans Corner is an unincorporated community in the town of Casco, in Kewaunee County, Wisconsin, United States. It was named after a local landowner, T. Ryan.

See also
Casco, Wisconsin
Casco Junction, Wisconsin

References

Unincorporated communities in Kewaunee County, Wisconsin
Unincorporated communities in Wisconsin